Sir Timothy Miles Fancourt, KC, styled Mr Justice Fancourt, is a judge of the English High Court.

Personal life and education 
Fancourt was born on the 30th of August 1964 and attended Whitgift School in Croydon. He studied law at Gonville and Caius College, Cambridge.

He married Emily Windsor in 2000, with whom he has a daughter.

Career 
He was called to the Bar at Lincoln's Inn in 1987. He initially became a tenant of London chambers at 11 Kings Bench Walk, latterly  Falcon Chambers. As a barrister he specialised in real property and landlord and tenant law. He was appointed Queen's Counsel in 2003.

In 1996 he was elected to the Bar Council of England and Wales. He was appointed as a Recorder in 2009 sitting at Harrow Crown Court until 2017. In 2012 he was appointed chairman of the Chancery Bar Association.

He was appointed a deputy High Court judge in 2013 and as a High Court Judge assigned to the Chancery Division in 2017. He received the customary knighthood in May 2019.

Fancourt is a co-editor of Muir Watt & Moss: Agricultural Holdings.

References

Living people
Members of Lincoln's Inn
20th-century British lawyers
21st-century British lawyers
English barristers
English King's Counsel
20th-century King's Counsel
Chancery Division judges
Knights Bachelor
Alumni of St Catherine's College, Oxford
1964 births